The 1959 Motocross World Championship was the 3rd edition of the Motocross World Championship organized by the FIM and reserved for 500cc motorcycles.

Summary
After five editions of the European Championship, from 1952 to 1956, the championship from 1957 took the name of the World Championship, at least for the 500cc class. The 250cc class, introduced this season, will also dispute five running-in seasons, from 1957 to 1961, a period in which it will take on the name of the European Cup, to become World Championship as well starting from the 1962 season.

From April 12 to August 23, the 500cc class held 9 grands prix which awarded points to the first six classified competitors, respectively: 8, 6, 4, 3, 2, 1. The score in the final classification of each competitor was calculated on the best four results.

Grands Prix

500cc

250cc

Final standings

500cc

Points are awarded to the top 6 classified finishers.

250cc

Notes

References

Motocross World Championship seasons
Motocross World Championship